Lesley Anne Elliott (born 26 September 1960 in Taumarunui) is a retired field hockey player from New Zealand, who was a member of the national team that finished sixth at the 1984 Summer Olympics in Los Angeles, California. Her former name is Going.

References
 New Zealand Olympic Committee

External links
 

New Zealand female field hockey players
Olympic field hockey players of New Zealand
Field hockey players at the 1984 Summer Olympics
1960 births
Living people
20th-century New Zealand women